Leonardo Zappavigna (born 27 October 1987) is an Australian professional boxer. He held the IBO lightweight title in 2010 and challenged for the IBF lightweight title in 2011. At regional level he held the IBO Asia Pacific lightweight and IBF Pan Pacific light-welterweight titles between 2008 and 2009 and the WBO Oriental light-welterweight title in 2014. As an amateur he won a bronze medal at the 2006 Commonwealth Games.

References

External links

1987 births
Living people
Australian people of Italian descent
Boxers at the 2006 Commonwealth Games
Commonwealth Games bronze medallists for Australia
International Boxing Organization champions
Boxers from Sydney
Australian male boxers
Commonwealth Games medallists in boxing
Lightweight boxers
Light-welterweight boxers
Medallists at the 2006 Commonwealth Games